Yobe Desert Stars Football Club is a Nigerian football (soccer) club based in the city of Damaturu. Starting in 2018 they will play in the Nigerian Premier League after consecutive promotions.

History
They started as an Amateur club and eventually were promoted to the Second Division in 2000. After winning promotion to the top level in 2001, they spent just one season in the NPL before being relegated with just 11 wins in 34 games. They also made it to the final of the 2002 Nigerian FA Cup where they lost 3–0 to Julius Berger FC. 
They were relegated to the Amateur League in 2007.

2017 season
After being promoted from the Nigeria Nationwide League in 2016, the Desert Stars won promotion to the NPFL on the last day of the National League season when they beat Adamawa United 2–0, returning to the top-flight for the first time in 15 years. They finished the season with twelve wins, four draws and seven losses.

Current squad

As of January 2018

Coach: Mohammed Baba Ganaru

References

Association football clubs established in 1991
Football clubs in Nigeria
Yobe State
Sports clubs in Nigeria